Klaus Peter Robert Cadsky (born 3 August 1937 in Hannover; died 11 March 2011 in Solothurn), known as Nico, was a Swiss German cartoonist.

He is well known for his caricatures of politicians published in Luzerner Neuste Nachrichten, Nebelspalter, Stern, Tages-Anzeiger, Blick and in journals of the AZ Medien Gruppe. He also worked for the Schweizer Fernsehen as a live cartoonist.

Further reading 

 Frank Lübke: Nico. Werd, Zurich 2003, .
 Nico Jahrbuch. A selection of Nico's Tages-Anzeiger cartoons. Tamedia / Werd, Zurich 2000-2003 (annual).
 With Milena Moser and Hans K. Studer: Bestechende Geschenke. A selection of Nico's Tages-Anzeiger cartoons. TA-Media AG / Werd, Zurich 1996, .

References 
The information in this article is based on that in its German equivalent.

German printmakers
Swiss caricaturists
Swiss cartoonists
Swiss graphic designers
Artists from Hanover
1937 births
2011 deaths
German emigrants to Switzerland